Whitmire can refer to:

People
 Bill Whitmire (born 1948), American politician
 Chris Whitmire (born 1968), American politician
 Don Whitmire (1922–1991), American football player
 Emily Whitmire (born 1991), American mixed martial artist
 John Whitmire (born 1949), American attorney and politician
 Kathy Whitmire (born 1946), American politician and accountant
 Sandra Smith Whitmire (born 1980), American TV journalist 
 Stan Whitmire (born 1963), American pianist
 Steve Whitmire (born 1959), American puppeteer

Places
 Whitmire, South Carolina, a town in Newberry County, South Carolina, US
 Whitmire Creek (Animas Mountains), a tributary to Animas Creek, Hidalgo County, New Mexico, US
 Whitmire Creek (Peloncillo Mountains), a tributary to Animas Creek, Hidalgo County, New Mexico, US
 Whitmire Canyon, the source of Whitmire Creek
 Whitmire Pass, a gap in the Animas Mountains, Hidalgo County, New Mexico, US
 Whitmire Ranch, a locale in Hidalgo County, New Mexico, US
 Whitmire Spring, a spring in Hidalgo County, New Mexico, US

See also
 Bob Waters Field at E. J. Whitmire Stadium, a football stadium in Cullowhee, North Carolina, US
 Newberry, Whitmire and Augusta Railroad, a South Carolina railroad company